Ryan Michale Benoit (born August 25, 1989) is an American mixed martial artist and bare knuckle boxer who competes in the Flyweight division. A professional competitor since 2009, he is currently signed to the BKFC and has competed for the Ultimate Fighting Championship (UFC), Shark Fights, and the MFC.

Mixed martial arts career

Early career
Benoit began training in 2007 and made his professional MMA debut in May 2009. He fought extensively in his native United States and amassed a record of 7-2 before joining the Ultimate Fighting Championship.

Ultimate Fighting Championship
Benoit made his promotional debut against fellow newcomer Josh Sampo on November 30, 2013 at The Ultimate Fighter 18 Finale. He lost the back-and-forth fight via rear-naked choke submission late in the second round. Despite the loss, Benoit won a Fight of the Night bonus award for the bout.

Benoit was expected to face Ray Borg on June 28, 2014 at UFC Fight Night 44. However, due to an injury, Benoit was replaced by promotional newcomer Shane Howell. 

Benoit faced Sergio Pettis on March 14, 2015 at UFC 185. After a first round in which Pettis seemed to have the upper hand, Benoit dropped Pettis with a left hook and finished him off with a flurry of ground and pound in the second round. Benoit received criticism from fans for kicking Pettis after the referee had separated the two fighters. Benoit immediately apologized for his behavior, claiming he had let his emotions get the better of him. Dana White later stated in the UFC 185 post fight press conference that the UFC wouldn't take any disciplinary actions towards Benoit, due to his immediate regret shown regarding the incident.

Benoit faced Ben Nguyen on November 15, 2015 at UFC 193. He lost the fight via submission in the first round.

Benoit next faced Fredy Serrano on July 30, 2016 at UFC 201. He won the fight via split decision.

Benoit faced Brandon Moreno on December 3, 2016 at The Ultimate Fighter 24 Finale. He lost the fight via split decision.

Benoit faced Ashkan Mokhtarian on November 19, 2017 at UFC Fight Night: Werdum vs. Tybura. At the weight-ins, Benoit weight in at 129 pounds, 3 pounds over the flyweight upper limit of 126 pounds. The bout proceeded at a catchweight and Benoit forfeited 20% of his purse to Mokhtarian. Benoit won the fight via knockout due to a head kick in the third round.

On January 5, 2018 it was announced that Benoit had signed a new, four-fight contract with UFC.

Benoit was expected to face Roberto Sanchez on September 8, 2018 at UFC 228. However, Benoit pulled out of the fight in late August for undisclosed reasons and was replaced by Jarred Brooks.

Benoit faced Alateng Heili in a bantamweight bout on December 21, 2019 at UFC Fight Night 165. He lost the fight via split decision.

Benoit was expected to face Tyson Nam on June 13, 2020 at UFC Fight Night: Eye vs. Calvillo. However, Benoit withdrew from the event for an unknown reason and was replaced by Zarrukh Adashev.

Benoit faced Tim Elliott on July 16, 2020 at UFC Fight Night: Kattar vs. Ige. He lost the fight via unanimous decision.

On September 3, 2020, Benoit along with Roman Dolidze, were granted temporary licenses following special hearings by the Nevada State Athletic Commission after they had recurring issues with the long-term metabolite of Turinabol pulsing in their system in trace amounts, long after ingestion. Both Benoit and Dolidze have already been suspended by USADA, the UFC's anti-doping partner. Neither were facing a violation in Nevada, but the UFC wanted to get ahead of a potential issue. This was after USADA added a threshold for the presence of the M3 metabolite of DHCMT. If a test result is below 100 picograms per milliliter of the substance, it is no longer considered a violation, but an atypical finding -- provided there is no evidence of new ingestion or performance-enhancing effects. Benoit and Dolidze were granted temporary licenses to compete beginning Dec. 1 following a six-month period of bimonthly testing by USADA. For Benoit, the process already cost him more than one year of his career after he originally tested positive for low levels of DHCMT (oral turinabol) starting on Nov. 11, 2018. At the time, Benoit tested positive for 30 picograms per mL at the time. 

Benoit was scheduled to face Zarrukh Adashev on May 8, 2021 at UFC on ESPN 24. At the weigh-ins, Benoit weighed in at 129 pounds, three pounds over the flyweight non-title fight limit. His bout with Adashev was cancelled by the Nevada State Athletic Commission due to health concerns. The pair was rebooked at UFC on ESPN 28 on July 31, 2021.  Benoit lost the fight via unanimous decision.

On August 21, 2021, it was announced Benoit was released by the UFC.

On October 20, 2021, The Nevada Athletic Commission suspended Benoit nine months retroactive to a positive urine sample collected on July 31. Benoit was flagged for modafinil, more commonly known as provigil. In addition to his suspension, Benoit faces a total of $3,445.36 in fines and legal fees. He will be eligible to return on April 1, 2022.

Championships and achievements
Ultimate Fighting Championship
Fight of the Night (One time) vs. Josh Sampo

Mixed martial arts record

|Loss
|align=center|10–8
|Zarrukh Adashev
|Decision (unanimous)
|UFC on ESPN: Hall vs. Strickland 
|
|align=center|3
|align=center|5:00
|Las Vegas, Nevada, United States
|
|-
|Loss
|align=center|10–7
|Tim Elliott
|Decision (unanimous)
|UFC on ESPN: Kattar vs. Ige 
|
|align=center|3
|align=center|5:00
|Abu Dhabi, United Arab Emirates
|
|-
|Loss
|align=center|10–6
|Alateng Heili
|Decision (split) 
|UFC Fight Night: Edgar vs. The Korean Zombie
|
|align=center|3
|align=center|5:00
|Busan, South Korea 
|
|-
|Win
|align=center|10–5
|Ashkan Mokhtarian
|KO (head kick)
|UFC Fight Night: Werdum vs. Tybura
|
|align=center|3
|align=center|2:38
|Sydney, Australia
|
|-
|Loss
|align=center|9–5
|Brandon Moreno
|Decision (split)
|The Ultimate Fighter: Tournament of Champions Finale 
|
|align=center|3
|align=center|5:00
|Las Vegas, Nevada, United States
|
|-
|Win
|align=center|9–4
|Fredy Serrano
|Decision (split)
|UFC 201 
|
|align=center|3
|align=center|5:00
|Atlanta, Georgia, United States
|
|-
| Loss
| align=center| 8–4 
| Ben Nguyen
| Submission (rear-naked choke)
| UFC 193
| 
| align=center| 1
| align=center| 2:35
| Melbourne, Australia
| 
|-
| Win
| align=center| 8–3
| Sergio Pettis
| TKO (punches)
| UFC 185
| 
| align=center| 2
| align=center| 1:34
| Dallas, Texas, United States
| 
|-
| Loss
| align=center| 7–3
| Josh Sampo
| Submission (rear-naked choke)
| The Ultimate Fighter: Team Rousey vs. Team Tate Finale
| 
| align=center| 2
| align=center| 4:31
| Las Vegas, Nevada, United States
| 
|-
| Win
| align=center| 7–2
| Cody Fuller
| TKO (punches)
| Legacy FC 24
| 
| align=center| 1
| align=center| 4:53
| Dallas, Texas, United States
| 
|-
| Loss
| align=center| 6–2
| Anthony Birchak
| Decision (unanimous)
| MFC 37
| 
| align=center| 3
| align=center| 5:00
| Edmonton, Alberta, Canada
| 
|-
| Win
| align=center| 6–1
| Joseph Sandoval
| TKO (punches)
| Legacy FC 16
| 
| align=center| 1
| align=center| 1:02
| Dallas, Texas, United States
| 
|-
| Win
| align=center| 5–1
| Randy Villarreal
| TKO (punches)
| Legacy FC 13
| 
| align=center| 1
| align=center| 1:35
| Dallas, Texas, United States
| 
|-
| Win
| align=center| 4–1
| Cody Williams
| Submission (rear-naked choke)
| Legacy FC 11
| 
| align=center| 2
| align=center| 2:52
| Houston, Texas, United States
| 
|-
| Win
| align=center| 3–1
| Matt Espinoza
| TKO (punches)
| Shark Fights 14: Horwich vs. Villefort
| 
| align=center| 2
| align=center| 2:14
| Lubbock, Texas, United States
| 
|-
| Loss
| align=center| 2–1
| Tim Snyder
| Decision (majority)
| SWC 11: Fury
| 
| align=center| 3
| align=center| 5:00
| Frisco, Texas, United States
| 
|-
| Win
| align=center| 2–0
| Davis Sylvester
| TKO (punches) 
| KOK 7: Judgement Day
| 
| align=center| 2
| align=center| 2:41
| Austin, Texas, United States
| 
|-
| Win
| align=center| 1–0
| LeJerrian Lindley
| TKO (punches)
| Xtreme Knockout 4
| 
| align=center| 1
| align=center| 2:09
| Arlington, Texas, United States
| 
|-

Bare knuckle boxing record

|-
|Loss
|align=center|0–1
|John Dodson	
|KO (punch)
|BKFC 28
|
|align=center|1
|align=center|0:40
|Albuquerque, New Mexico, United States
|

See also
 List of male mixed martial artists

References

External links

Living people
1989 births
People from Dallas
American male mixed martial artists
Flyweight mixed martial artists
Bantamweight mixed martial artists
Mixed martial artists utilizing Brazilian jiu-jitsu
Ultimate Fighting Championship male fighters
American practitioners of Brazilian jiu-jitsu